The Municipality of Rogašovci is a municipality in the traditional region of Prekmurje in northeastern Slovenia. The seat of the municipality is the town of Rogašovci. Rogašovci became a municipality in 1994.

Settlements
In addition to the municipal seat of Rogašovci, the municipality also includes the following settlements:

 Fikšinci
 Kramarovci
 Nuskova
 Ocinje
 Pertoča
 Ropoča
 Serdica
 Sotina
 Sveti Jurij
 Večeslavci

References

External links

Municipality of Rogašovci on Geopedia
Municipality of Rogašovci website

Rogašovci
1994 establishments in Slovenia